Tomislav Zografski (29 March 193414 January 2000) was a Macedonian composer and music pedagogue who also wrote music for film and television.
His progressive neoclassical language played a key part in the journey of Macedonian music toward the postmodern era. Zografski's musical language was not archetypal of neoclassical folklore-inspired pastiche but instead more the result of him venturing into the examination and development of more exemplar traditional repertoire in a way that was unconventional and compelling and which retained transformed elements from an earlier period.

Zografski was born in Veles, Kingdom of Yugoslavia (now Macedonia) on 29 March 1934.  He studied music at Skopje Music School and Belgrade Music School and composition at the Music Academy in Belgrade. In 1967 he became professor at the Faculty of Music, Ss. Cyril and Methodius University in Skopje.

Awards 

 1961 First Prize, Union of Youth Competition for Suite for piano solo
 1962 City’s Committee of SMM Award for Suite for piano
 1962 City’s Committee of SMM Award for Suite for violin and piano
 1969 First Prize, University Skopje Competition for In praise of Cyril and Methodius
 1969 ″11 October″ Award for In praise of Cyril and Methodius
 1972 First Prize of Yugoslav Radio Festival for Molitva
 1973 Golden Arena (Film Music Award) for Ukleti smo, Irina
 1979 First Prize, Award of RTV (MRT)  Skopje for Madrigals 
 1979 First Prize, Award of RTV (MRT) Skopje for Karaorman Cantata
 1980 TEHO (Tetovo Choir Festival) Award for Vardar
 1981 TEHO (Tetovo Choir Festival) Award for Dojdovme
 1981 ″13 November″ Award of City of Skopje for Passacaglia
 1991 ″Panche Peshev″, Macedonian Composers′ Association (SOKOM) Award for Scherzo
 1991 ″Panche Peshev″, Macedonian Composers′ Association (SOKOM) Award for Sonata for two pianos
 1994 Winner of the State ″11 October″ Achievement Award
 1997 Trajko Prokopiev Macedonian Composers′ Association (SOKOM) Lifetime Achievement Award

Selected works 
 Invention Syrinx for flute solo, Op. 8 (1954–5)
 Ten miniatures for piano, Op. 11
 Sonata for bassoon and piano, Op. 17 (1958)
 Suite, Op. 27 (1960)
 Nine Miniatures: for symphony orchestra (1961)
 Suite for solo piano, Op. 27 (1961)
 Suite for violin and piano, Op. 28 (1962)
 Scripts for baritone and piano, Op. 39 (1963)
 Fantasia corale (1967)
 String Quartet, Op. 58 (1968)
 Sonatina in C for two pianos, Op. 142 (1969)
 In praise of Cyril and Methodius (1969)
 Cantus Coronatus (1969)
 Siyaniem for soloist and mixed choir, Op. 74 (1972)
 Allegro barrocco for two violins and piano (1973)
 Passacaglia, symphonic poem (1981)
 Essay On The Rain — song cycle for voice and piano (1982)
 Compositions for viola and violin, violin and piano, Op. 100-103 (1982-3)
 Song for solo violin, Op. 101 (1983)
 Songs for Jakshini for voice and piano (1983)
 Scherzo for symphony orchestra (1985)
 Rhapsody for violin and piano, Op. 103
 Three lyrical chants, Op. 107 (1985)
 Sonata for two pianos, Op. 122 (1990)
 Skherzo (1991)
 Five pieces for clarinet, Op. 131 (1997)
 Sinfonietta in E-flat
 Sinfonietta in B
 Ballade for piano
 Marika beautiful girl — (Hommage to P. I. Tchaikovsky) for soprano and piano

Music for film and television
 Pod isto nebo (1964)
 Denovi na iskusenie (1965)
 Zalez nad ezerskata zemja (6 episodes) (1973)
 Kolnati sme, Irina (1973)
 The Longest Journey (1976)
 The Verdict (1977)
 Najdolgiot pat (1977)
 Beliot sid (1978)
 Kliment Ohridski (1986)

References

External links 
 YouTube, Sonata for two pianos, Op. 122 (1990)
 YouTube, Siyaniem for soloist and mixed choir, Op. 74 (1972)

Macedonian composers
Male composers
20th-century classical composers
Composers for piano
Choral composers
Neoclassical composers
1934 births
2000 deaths
20th-century male musicians